A list of mammals of Lithuania published in 1997 contains 68 species that are present in the country, including 14 bat species, 21 rodents, four shrews, two lagomorphs, one hedgehog, 13 carnivores, five whales and eight ungulates.

The following tags are used to highlight each species' conservation status as assessed on the IUCN Red List:

Some species were assessed using an earlier set of criteria. Species assessed using this system have the following instead of near threatened and least concern categories:

Order: Rodentia (rodents)

Rodents make up the largest order of mammals, with over 40% of mammalian species. They have two incisors in the upper and lower jaw which grow continually and must be kept short by gnawing. Most rodents are small though the capybara can weigh up to 45 kg (100 lb).

Suborder: Sciurognathi
Family: Castoridae (beavers)
Genus: Castor
 Eurasian beaver, C. fiber 
Family: Sciuridae (squirrels)
Subfamily: Sciurinae
Family: Gliridae (dormice)
Subfamily: Leithiinae
Genus: Dryomys
 Forest dormouse, D. nitedula LC
Genus: Eliomys
 Garden dormouse, Eliomys quercinus VU
Genus: Muscardinus
 Hazel dormouse, Muscardinus avellanarius LR/nt
Subfamily: Glirinae
Genus: Glis
 European edible dormouse, Glis glis LR/nt
Family: Cricetidae
Subfamily: Arvicolinae
Genus: Arvicola
 Water vole, Arvicola terrestris LR/lc
Genus: Clethrionomys
 Bank vole, Clethrionomys glareolus LR/lc
Genus: Microtus
 Field vole, Microtus agrestis LR/lc
 Common vole, Microtus arvalis LR/lc
Family: Muridae (mice, rats, voles, gerbils, hamsters, etc.)
Subfamily: Murinae
Genus: Apodemus
 Striped field mouse, Apodemus agrarius LR/lc
 Yellow-necked mouse, Apodemus flavicollis LR/lc
 Wood mouse, Apodemus sylvaticus LC
Genus: Micromys
 Harvest mouse, Micromys minutus LR/nt

Order: Lagomorpha (lagomorphs)

The following two lagomorphs are present in the country:
Family: Leporidae (rabbits, hares)
Genus: Lepus
European hare, L. europaeus 
Mountain hare, L. timidus

Order: Erinaceomorpha (hedgehogs and gymnures)

The order Erinaceomorpha contains a single family, Erinaceidae, which comprise the hedgehogs and gymnures. The hedgehogs are easily recognised by their spines while gymnures look more like large rats.

Family: Erinaceidae (hedgehogs)
Subfamily: Erinaceinae
Genus: Erinaceus
 Southern white-breasted hedgehog, Erinaceus concolor LR/lc
 West European hedgehog, Erinaceus europaeus LR/lc

Order: Soricomorpha (shrews, moles, and solenodons)

The following four shrew species are present in the country:
Family: Soricidae (shrews)
Subfamily: Soricinae
Tribe: Soricini
Genus: Sorex
Common shrew, S. araneus 
Eurasian pygmy shrew, S. minutus  
Genus: Neomys
Eurasian water shrew, N. fodiens 
Family: Talpidae (moles)
Subfamily: Talpinae
Tribe: Talpini
Genus: Talpa
 European mole, T. europaea

Order: Chiroptera (bats)
The bats' most distinguishing feature is that their forelimbs are developed as wings, making them the only mammals capable of flight. Bat species account for about 20% of all mammals.
Family: Vespertilionidae
Subfamily: Myotinae
Genus: Myotis
 Pond bat, Myotis dasycneme VU
Subfamily: Vespertilioninae
Genus: Barbastella
Western barbastelle, B. barbastellus 
Genus: Nyctalus
 Lesser noctule, Nyctalus leisleri LR/nt
Genus: Pipistrellus
 Common pipistrelle, Pipistrellus pipistrellus LC

Order: Cetacea (whales)

The order Cetacea includes whales, dolphins and porpoises. They are the mammals most fully adapted to aquatic life with a spindle-shaped nearly hairless body, protected by a thick layer of blubber, and forelimbs and tail modified to provide propulsion underwater.

Suborder: Mysticeti
Family: Balaenidae (right whales)
Genus: Balaena
 North Atlantic right whale, Eubalaena glacialis CR or functionally extinct in the eastern Atlantic'
Family: Balaenopteridae
Subfamily: Balaenopterinae
Genus: Balaenoptera
 Fin whale, Balaenoptera physalus EN
 Common minke whale, Balaenoptera acutorostrata LC
Subfamily: Megapterinae
Genus: Megaptera
 Humpback whale, Megaptera novaeangliae LC
Suborder: Odontoceti
Family: Phocoenidae
Genus: Phocoena
 Harbour porpoise, Phocoena phocoena VU
Family: Monodontidae
Genus: Delphinapterus
 Beluga, Delphinapterus leucas VU
Family: Ziphidae
Genus: Mesoplodon
 Sowerby's beaked whale, Mesoplodon bidens DD
Family: Delphinidae (marine dolphins)
Genus: Lagenorhynchus
 White-beaked dolphin, Lagenorhynchus albirostris LR/lc
Genus: Tursiops
 Bottlenose dolphin, Tursiops truncatus DD
Genus: Grampus
 Risso's dolphin, Grampus griseus DD
Genus: Orcinus
 Orca, Orcinus orca DD

Order: Carnivora (carnivorans)

There are over 260 species of carnivorans, the majority of which feed primarily on meat. They have a characteristic skull shape and dentition. 
Suborder: Feliformia
Family: Felidae (cats)
Subfamily: Felinae
Genus: Lynx
Eurasian lynx, L. lynx 
Suborder: Caniformia
Family: Canidae (dogs, foxes)
Genus: Canis
Gray wolf, C. lupus 
Genus: Vulpes
Red fox, V. vulpes 
Family: Mustelidae (mustelids)
Genus: Lutra
European otter, L. lutra 
Genus: Martes
European pine marten, M. martes 
Genus: Meles
European badger, M. meles 
Genus: Mustela
Least weasel, M. nivalis 
Stoat, M. erminea 
European polecat, M. putorius 
Genus: Neogale
American mink, N. vison  introduced
Family: Phocidae (earless seals)
Genus: Halichoerus
 Gray seal, Halichoerus grypus

Order: Artiodactyla (even-toed ungulates)

The even-toed ungulates are ungulates whose weight is borne about equally by the third and fourth toes, rather than mostly or entirely by the third as in perissodactyls. There are about 220 artiodactyl species, including many that are of great economic importance to humans.
Family: Cervidae (deer)
Subfamily: Capreolinae
Genus: Alces
 Moose, A. alces 
Genus: Capreolus
Roe deer, C. capreolus 
Subfamily: Cervinae
Genus: Cervus
Red deer, C. elaphus 
Genus: Dama
 European fallow deer, D. dama  introduced
Family: Bovidae (cattle, antelope, sheep, goats)
Subfamily: Bovinae
Genus: Bison
European bison, B. bonasus  reintroduced
Genus: Bos
 Aurochs, B. primigenius 
Family: Suidae (pigs)
Subfamily: Suinae
Genus: Sus
Wild boar, S. scrofa

Locally extinct 
The following species are locally extinct in the country:
European mink, Mustela lutreola
Siberian flying squirrel, Pteromys volans
Brown bear, Ursus arctos

See also
List of chordate orders
Lists of mammals by region
List of prehistoric mammals
Mammal classification
List of mammals described in the 2000s

References

External links

Lithuania
Mammals
Mammals
Lithuania